The Little Variety Star (German: Die Kleine vom Varieté) is a 1926 German silent comedy film directed by Hanns Schwarz and starring Ossi Oswalda, Georg Alexander and Max Hansen. The film's sets were designed by Hans Jacoby.

Cast
 Ossi Oswalda as Rositta, die Kleine vom Varieté  
 Georg Alexander as Dr. Peter Kretschmar  
 Max Hansen as Fred 
 Vivian Gibson as Josette  
 Ferry Sikla as Onkel

References

Bibliography
 Thomas Elsaesser & Michael Wedel. The BFI companion to German cinema. British Film Institute, 1999.

External links

1926 films
Films of the Weimar Republic
German silent feature films
Films directed by Hanns Schwarz
UFA GmbH films
German black-and-white films
German comedy films
Silent comedy films
1920s German films